Eucalyptus carolaniae is a species of small to medium-sized tree that is endemic to a small area of Victoria. It has thick, rough, fibrous bark on the trunk grading to thin finely furrowed bark on the branches. It has glossy green, lance-shaped adult leaves, flower buds in groups of seven, white flowers and cylindrical to oval fruit.

Description
It has thick, rough, fibrous, greyish brown bark at the base of the trunk grading to thin, finely furrowed bark higher up. Flowering occurs in summer and the flowers are white.

Taxonomy and naming
Eucalyptus carolaniae was first formally described in 2012 by Kevin James Rule from a specimen collected near Mount Martha and the description was published in the journal Muelleria''''. The specific epithet (carolaniae) honours Pat Carolan who brought the species to the attention of the author, Rule.

Distribution and habitat
This species of eucalypt is only known from a single population above Mount Martha township on the Mornington Peninsula where in grows in sheltered gullies and sometimes hybridises with E. viminalis''.

See also
List of Eucalyptus species

References

Flora of Victoria (Australia)
Trees of Australia
carolaniae
Myrtales of Australia
Plants described in 2012